The Racing Scene is a  1969 documentary film about actor James Garner and his auto racing team, directed by Andy Sidaris. It was the first film directed by Sidaris, whose background at that time had been in sports broadcasting.

Sources

See also
 List of American films of 1969

References

External links
 

1969 films
Films directed by Andy Sidaris
American auto racing films
Documentary films about auto racing
1969 documentary films
American sports documentary films
Documentary films about actors
1969 directorial debut films
1960s English-language films
1960s American films